Al-Nasirah may refer to:

Nazareth, an Arab city in Israel called al-Nasirah in Arabic)
al-Nasirah, Syria, a Christian village in Syria